Colonel Chira Silpakanok (also spelled Jira, 7 May 1928 – 25 January 2013) was a prominent Thai architect of the post-World War II period. His works were influential in the popularization of Modernist architecture in Thailand, and include such buildings as the Indra Hotel and the Scala Cinema.

References

Chira Silpakanok
1928 births
2013 deaths
Chira Silpakanok
Chira Silpakanok